is the debut solo album by Miyavi. It was released on October 31, 2002.

Track listing

References

2002 albums
Miyavi albums
Free-Will albums